Bambafouga is a town in mid southern Guinea.

Transport 
It is a proposed junction on the future standard gauge Transguinean Railways.

References 

Populated places in the Mamou Region